Schinia honesta, or the black-spotted gem, is a moth of the family Noctuidae. The species was first described by Augustus Radcliffe Grote in 1881. It is found in southern Canada and California. The wingspan is about 25–26 mm.

References

Schinia
Moths of North America
Moths described in 1881

Taxa named by Augustus Radcliffe Grote